Drexel Manor station is a SEPTA Route 102 trolley station in Drexel Hill, Pennsylvania. The station is officially located near Burmont Road and Cheswold Road, although it is actually southwest of the Burmont Road grade crossing. Like the Marshall Road stop, the Route 102 line runs in between Cheswold and Blanchard Roads, both of which terminate at Burmont Road. Two schools are located in the vicinity of this station.

Trolleys arriving at this station travel between 69th Street Terminal in Upper Darby, Pennsylvania and Sharon Hill, Pennsylvania. The station contains an open concrete shelter on the northbound platform of the tracks with a connecting sidewalk between two houses on Blanchard Road. On the opposite side, the southbound platform can be found in front of a parking lot for a housing project across from the intersection of Cheswold and Lasher Roads.

A vacant lot on the southeast corner of the Burmont Road grade crossing could have served as the site of a former station house in the past. A sidewalk along Cheswold Road leads to the platform, and a retaining wall across the tracks may or may not have included another one at one time. Drexel Manor Station is located two blocks southwest of the Garrettford stop.

Station layout

External links

 Station from Google Maps Street View

SEPTA Media–Sharon Hill Line stations